The 2009–10 Missouri Mavericks season is the inaugural season of the Central Hockey League (CHL) franchise in Independence, Missouri, a suburb of Kansas City, Missouri.

Off-season
In April 2009, Matt Adams, Mark Adams, and Mike Carper, the owners of the group Independence Pro Hockey, LLC, announced that their group would bring a Central Hockey League team to Independence, Missouri to begin play in the 2009–10 season.  Independence Pro Hockey, LLC previously owned the Lubbock Cotton Kings, also of the Central Hockey League.  The team would play at the Independence Events Center as part of a 10-year lease agreement.

Brad Lund, previously the President and Chief Executive Officer of the Oklahoma City Blazers from 1992 to 2008, was tapped to serve as President of Independence Pro Hockey, LLC and run the day-to-day operations of the team.  Brent Thiessen was to be the team's General Manager and Joe Greene was hired to be the team's Assistant General Manager.

On June 2, 2009, Scott Hillman, a former player in the Central Hockey League and previously the cead coach of the Knoxville Ice Bears of the Southern Professional Hockey League, winning both back-to-back regular season titles and league championships for both the 2007–08 season and 2008–09 season, was named as the team's new head coach.  Hillman also won the Coach of The Year award for the SPHL for the 2008–09 season.

On June 25, 2009, it was announced that the team would be called the Missouri Mavericks.

Regular season

Conference standings

Note: GP = Games played; W = Wins; L = Losses; OTL = Overtime loss; Pts = Points; GF = Goals for; GA = Goals against

y – clinched conference title; x – clinched playoff spot; e – eliminated from playoff contention

Playoffs
On April 2, 2010, the Mavericks' inaugural 2009–10 season ended with a 7–6 loss to the Rapid City Rush in Game 4 of the Ray Miron President's Cup Playoffs Northern Conference Semifinals.

Awards, Records, and Milestones

Awards and Records

Transactions

Player Signings/Acquisitions off Waivers/Activated from League Suspension

Waived/Retired/Placements on Team Suspension

Trades

Roster
Source:

See also
 2012–13 CHL season

References

External links
 Missouri Mavericks Official Website
 2009-10 Missouri Mavericks Regular Season on PointStreak.com
 2009-10 Missouri Mavericks Post-Season on PointStreak.com
 2009–10 Missouri Mavericks season at EliteProspects.com

Missouri Mavericks seasons
Missouri
Missouri
2009 in sports in Missouri
2010 in sports in Missouri